The Fujifilm FinePix S1 Pro was an interchangeable lens digital single-lens reflex camera introduced in January 2000. It was based on a Nikon F60 (Nikon N60 in the U.S.) film camera body that was modified by Fujifilm to include its own proprietary image sensor and electronics.  Because of the Nikon body, it had a Nikon F lens mount and so could use most lenses made for Nikon 35 mm cameras.  It was autofocusing, had an electronically controlled focal plane shutter with speeds from 30 sec. to 1/2000 sec. and built-in exposure metering and pop-up flash.  Its ISO film speed equivalents ranged from 320-1600. 
The camera is no longer in production, having been superseded by the Fujifilm FinePix S2 Pro in January 2002.

Aside from the Nikon lens mount, the camera's principal distinction was its unique (and controversial) 3.1 megapixel photo sensor.  Known as the Super CCD, it was unique in having its photodiodes oriented diagonally rather than horizontally and vertically as in all other SLR cameras.  This allowed the use of a sophisticated interpolation system that produced an output image equivalent to 6.2 megapixels.  The apparent resolution of images in this interpolated mode lay somewhere between 3.1 megapixels and the 6.2 megapixel interpolated output.

S1